Haploceratoidea, formerly Haplocerataceae, is an extinct superfamily of ammonoid cephalopods belonging to the Ammonitida that unites three families, Strigoceratidae, Oppeliidae, and Haploceratidae, listed below.

Haploceratoidea begins with all three families in the lower Middle Jurassic, Bajocian.  Strigoceratidae is limited to the Bajocian but Oppeliidae, and Haploceratidae extend through the remaining Jurassic, well into the Cretaceous; the Oppeliidae into the middle Albian, the Haplocertidae only into the Valanginian.

Diagnosis
Haploceratoidea are typically compressed, discoidal Ammontida that may be keeled or unkeeled, tending to be oxyconic, with usually falcoid or falcate ribbing. The aptychi are paired and differ between families and  have been found in situ in e.g. Oppelia subrudiata and in Pseudolissoceras.

Taxonomy
The Origin of the Haploceratoidea is undetermined but it is likely all three component families have their beginnings in the Hammatoceratidae in the middle Bajocian.  None of the Haploceratoidea is thought to have given rise to any subsequent group.

Superfamily Haploceratoidea Zittel, 1884
Family Haploceratidae Zittel, 1884
Genus Lissoceras Bayle, 1879
Genus Glochiceras Hyatt, 1900
Genus Haploceras Zittel, 1870
Genus Neolissoceras Spath, 1923
Family Oppeliidae Bonarelli, 1894
Subfamily Aconeceratinae (Spath, 1923)
Genus Aconeceras Hyatt, 1903
Genus Gyaloceras Whitehouse, 1927
Genus Koloceras Riccardi et al., 1987
Genus Sanmartinoceras
Subfamily Hecticoceratinae Spath, 1925
Genus Hecticoceras Bonarelli, 1893
Genus Pseudosonninia Parent, 2019
Subfamily Mazapilitinae Spath, 1928
Subfamily Oppeliinae Bonarelli, 1894
Genus Submazapilites Cantu-Chapa, 1962
Subfamily Streblitinae Spath, 1925
Genus Bornhardticeras Böhm & Riedel, 1933
Genus Cyrtosiceras Hyatt, 1900
Genus Substreblites Spath, 1925
Genus Uhligites Kilian, 1913
Subfamily incertae sedis
Genus Naramoceras McNamara, 1985
Family Strigoceratidae Buckman, 1924
Genus Oecoptychius 
Genus Phlycticeras Hyatt, 1900
Genus Strigoceras Quenstedt, 1886

References

 Treatise on Invertebrate Paleontology, Part L Ammonoidea, (L171), Geological Society of America and University of Kansas press, 1964.

 
Ammonitina
Ammonitida superfamilies
Bajocian first appearances
Early Cretaceous extinctions